Mohammed Marwa may refer to:
Mohammed Buba Marwa, a Nigerian politician
Maitatsine, born Mohammed Marwa, controversial Islamic scholar